Caulerpa cactoides is a species of seaweed in the Caulerpaceae family.

It is found along the coast in a large area extending from near Exmouth in the northern Gascoyne region to east of Esperance in the Goldfields-Esperance region of Western Australia.

References

cactoides
Species described in 1817